Lot 38 is a township in Kings County, Prince Edward Island, Canada.  It is part of St. Patrick's Parish. Lot 38 was one of four lots awarded to the officers of the 78th Fraser Highlanders in the 1767 land lottery.

References

38
Geography of Kings County, Prince Edward Island